William Pitcher (born 5 February 1910 in Coventry, England - died 24 October 1995) was an international motorcycle speedway rider who rode in the first ever World Championship final in 1936.

Career summary 
Pitcher rode for Leicester Stadium, Crystal Palace Glaziers, Coventry, Birmingham Bulldogs and the  Harringay Tigers before World War II and was a member of the team that won the London Cup in 1935. In 1936 he rode in the first ever Speedway World Championship. After the end of the war he joined the Belle Vue Aces. Pitcher was also a member of the England team that toured Australia in 1946–47. He made his England international debut in 1939. His final season was in 1949 with the Wimbledon Dons.

World Final appearances 
 1936 -  London, Wembley Stadium - 17th - 8pts

References 

1910 births
1995 deaths
British speedway riders
Harringay Racers riders
Coventry Bees riders
Birmingham Brummies riders
Belle Vue Aces riders
Wimbledon Dons riders
Leicester Stadium riders